"Forever and One (Neverland)" is a power ballad by German power metal band Helloween from the album The Time of the Oath and composed by lead vocalist Andi Deris. The German version of the single contains a live version of "In the Middle of a Heartbeat" from their album High Live.

Track listing

Japanese version

Personnel
Andi Deris - vocals
Roland Grapow - lead and rhythm guitars
Michael Weikath - lead and rhythm guitars
Markus Grosskopf - bass guitar
Uli Kusch - drums

References

1996 singles
1996 songs
Helloween songs
Songs written by Andi Deris
Heavy metal ballads